Buonarroti (Buonarotti) is a surname, and may refer to

Michelangelo Buonarroti (1475–1564), the Italian artist known as Michelangelo 
Filippo Buonarroti (1661–1733), Florentine official and grandnephew of Michelangelo
John Buonarotti Papworth (1775–1847), prolific architect and artist
Philippe Buonarroti (1761–1837), revolutionary writer

Italian-language surnames